Lingam Venkata Prabhakar is an Indian businessman. He is the Managing Director and CEO of Canara Bank. He was the former executive director of Punjab National Bank.

Early life
Prabhakar did a master’s degree in agriculture. He is a Certified Associate of Indian Institute of Bankers (CAIIB). He did his graduation from Indian Institute of Banking and Finance.

Career
Prabhakar started his career as Chief Risk Officer and GM-Integrated Risk management at Allahabad Bank. He joined Punjab National Bank on 1 March 2018 as the executive director. He became the Managing Director and CEO of Canara Bank from 1 February 2020 and will continue to hold his position till 31 December 2022.

References

Living people
Indian bankers
Indian chief executives
Indian businesspeople
Year of birth missing (living people)